Ioannis Karathanasis (alternate spelling: Giannis) (Greek: Γιάννης Καραθανάσης; born February 17, 1991) is a Greek former professional basketball player. At a height of 2.03 m (6'8") tall, he played at both the small forward or power forward positions, with small forward being his primary position.

Professional career
Karathanasis began his basketball career playing with the youth clubs of the Asteria Basketball Academy in Thessaloniki, Greece. He joined the Greek League power Olympiacos in the year 2008, and played with their youth clubs, before going on loan to the semi-pro Greek 3rd Division club Mantoulidis, for the 2009–10 season.

He began his pro career in 2010, when he joined the Greek League club Panellinios. In August 2011, he signed with the Greek League club Kavala. In September 2014, Karathanasis signed a contract with Aris for the 2014–15 season. On September 15, 2015, he was officially signed by Aries Trikala for the 2015–16 season.

National team career
With Greece's junior national teams, Karathanasis won the gold medal at the 2008 Albert Schweitzer Tournament, and the 2008 FIBA Europe Under-18 Championship, as well as the silver medal at the 2009 FIBA Under-19 World Cup.

References

External links
FIBA Profile
FIBA Europe Profile
EuroCup Profile
Eurobasket.com Profile
Greek League Profile 

1991 births
Living people
Aries Trikala B.C. players
Aris B.C. players
Greek men's basketball players
Kavala B.C. players
Panellinios B.C. players
Power forwards (basketball)
Small forwards
Basketball players from Thessaloniki